Panther Junction is an unincorporated community located in Brewster County, Texas, United States. The community is located inside Big Bend National Park. The ZIP Code serving the community is 79834, which is addressed to Big Bend National Park.

Geography
Panther Junction is located at  latitude 29.329 degrees north and longitude 103.205 degrees west (29.329, -103.205); or approximately twenty miles east of Study Butte.

Climate

Education

Panther Junction is served by the San Vicente Independent School District, which located its school facility there circa 1951. The district covers most of Big Bend National Park and Southeastern Brewster County. High schoolers zoned to San Vicente ISD attend school in Terlingua Common School District's Big Bend High School.

Previously Alpine High School of the Alpine Independent School District served as the high school for students from San Vicente ISD. In 1996 Big Bend High opened, and San Vicente began sending students to Big Bend High when it was established.

References

Unincorporated communities in Brewster County, Texas
Unincorporated communities in Texas